The New Plymouth Congregational Church is a historic church on Southwest Avenue between West Park and Plymouth in New Plymouth, Idaho.  It was built in 1920 and was added to the National Register in 1982.

A review by the Idaho State Historical Society identifies that "The New Plymouth Congregational Church is architecturally significant as a full—scale, monumentally porticoed and pedimented neo-classical revival church which is the outstanding structure in New Plymouth, and which is related to that town's unusual history."

References

Congregational churches in Idaho
Churches on the National Register of Historic Places in Idaho
Neoclassical architecture in Idaho
Churches completed in 1920
Buildings and structures in Payette County, Idaho
National Register of Historic Places in Payette County, Idaho
Neoclassical church buildings in the United States